World Wonder Ring Stardom (スターダム 女子プロレス), often referred to simply as Stardom (stylized as ST★RDOM), is a Japanese joshi puroresu or women's professional wrestling promotion based in Tokyo, Japan. Stardom was founded in September 2010 by former All Japan Women co-producer Rossy Ogawa, retired professional wrestler and mixed martial artist Fuka Kakimoto, and All Japan Women veteran professional wrestler Nanae Takahashi. Stardom is currently owned by Japanese card game company Bushiroad, making it the sister promotion of New Japan Pro-Wrestling (NJPW).

Stardom quickly became one of the top joshi puroresu promotions, largely thanks to gravure idol Yuzuki Aikawa becoming the promotion's public face. Much like JDStar, Stardom also places heavy emphasis on the physical attractiveness of its workers, and publishes several modeling photobooks and calendars of its workers per year. Stardom's in-ring style takes influence from mixed martial arts with many workers relying on kicks as the main part of their offense.

Stardom frequently holds shows in Tokyo while also often traveling to Osaka for daytime and nighttime events within the same day. In 2020 "We Are Stardom!!" would start to be aired on BS Nittele and Tokyo MX and that marked the first time that Joshi Puroresu promotion has had a weekly national television program after All Japan Women's Pro Wrestling (AJW) left Fuji TV in 2002.

History

Formation

After retiring from professional wrestling on March 29, 2010, Fuka began training Yuzuki Aikawa, a notable gravure idol signed to Platinum Production, the same modeling agency as her, for a career in professional wrestling. In April 2010, Fuka was approached by Rossy Ogawa, about starting a new promotion with Aikawa as the top star. During the summer of 2010, Fuka continued training Aikawa for her upcoming debut planned for October, while also training newcomers such as Mayu Iwatani, Arisa Hoshiki, Yoshiko, Yoko Bito, and Eri Susa. These plans came together by September when Ogawa held a press conference with the newly formed roster of Fuka's trainees and Aikawa in attendance to announce a new promotion named World Wonder Ring Stardom. Fuka was appointed general manager of the promotion, as well as the role of ring announcer. Veteran All Japan Women (AJW) wrestler Nanae Takahashi was appointed the playing manager. In addition to Fuka's trainees, Aikawa, and Takahashi, Takahashi's longtime associate and fellow AJW wrestler Natsuki☆Taiyo and mixed martial artist Mika Nagano, who had some experience in professional wrestling with the Ice Ribbon promotion, joined the promotion.

2011–2013
Stardom held its first event, Birth of Nova, on January 23, 2011, in Tokyo's Shin-Kiba 1st Ring, the venue that would frequently host events for the promotion in the following years and was also the location of Stardom's earliest training dojo. Originally, Stardom named and promoted events in the format of "seasons," with one season lasting, on average, two months. The opening match involved seasoned Takahashi and Taiyo, as well as Aikawa. The main event of the debut show saw Yoko Bito, who had an extensive Karate background before her wrestling training against 17-year-old Yoshiko. The two were considered the top trainees on the new roster.

Stardom continued holding shows at Shin-Kiba 1st Ring each month before eventually holding their first-ever show at Korakuen Hall on July 24. At the event, 9-year-old Haruka, who had debuted on the first show, faced DDT Pro-Wrestling star Kenny Omega in a match that became a viral hit on YouTube, reaching over 1 million views. Several champions were crowned at the event as well. Aikawa defeated Yoshiko to become the first-ever Wonder of Stardom Champion and Natsuki Taiyo defeated JWP wrestler Leon to win the High Speed Championship. The inaugural World of Stardom Champion was crowned in a four-person tournament, with Takahashi defeating Bito in the final. Another notable development in Stardom's Korakuen Hall debut was freelancer Io Shirai, who had been appearing in various other Joshi Puroresu promotions alongside her sister, Mio Shirai, and Kana as the stable Triple Tails. Shirai made a surprise appearance at the end of Stardom X Stardom, requesting to join the company.

The crowning of the first-ever Goddess of Stardom Championship began on October 10 with the Goddesses of Stardom Tag League, a round-robin tournament that has been held annually since. The team of Yuzuki Aikawa and Yoko Bito, collectively known as BY Hou, defeated Yoshiko and Natsuki Taiyo (Kawasaki Katsushika Saikyou Densetsu) in the finals on November 27.

On November 12, the first Rookie of Stardom award was given, in which rookie wrestlers that had debuted within the year faced off. The final saw Yoshiko defeating Arisa Hoshiki to become the first recipient.

In May 2012, Io Shirai had gone to Mexico for a tour and was involved in an incident when returning to Japan. Upon her return to Japan, Shirai and then-boyfriend Nosawa Rongai (a freelance Japanese professional wrestler) were arrested at the Narita International Airport in Narita, Chiba on suspicion of trying to smuggle 75 grams of marijuana hidden inside paintings of the two into the country. Both Shirai and Nosawa denied the charges, claiming that the paintings were gifts from fans. Shirai was released from a detention center on June 12. On June 21, Shirai held a press conference, publicly apologizing to her fans, employers and co-workers, while again denying the charges. On June 28, Japan's public prosecutor's office decided not to prosecute Shirai over the incident. On July 9, Mexico-based Japanese wrestler Takuya Sugi held a press conference and confessed to planting the drugs on Shirai and Nosawa. According to Sugi, Masahiro Hayashi, who worked as a liaison between Lucha Libre AAA Worldwide and Japan and who apparently had a personal grudge with Nosawa, had promised him a contract extension with AAA in exchange for the deed.

The first 5★Star Grand Prix, a two-block round-robin tournament, commenced on August 19 at Shin-Kiba 1st Ring, and ran until September 30, becoming their biggest annual tournament every year. The finals saw Yuzuki Aikawa defeating Kyoko Kimura on September 30.

At Stardom Year-End Climax in December, the creation of the promotion's trios championship, the Artist of Stardom Championship, was announced.

Stardom's next Korakuen Hall show on March 17, Stardom the Highest, would mark a World of Stardom title change for the first time when German wrestler Alpha Female, now aligned with Kyoko Kimura's Kimura Monster-gun unit, defeated Nanae Takahashi for the World of Stardom Championship. On April 29, Yuzuki Aikawa had the first of what would become a tradition for many departing Stardom wrestlers in the form of a gauntlet match, where they face the entire roster in one-minute singles matches.

Stardom Ryōgoku Cinderella Champions Fiesta 2013 was the biggest event in the history of Stardom in its two-year history to that point, taking place April 29 at the historic Ryōgoku Kokugikan venue in Tokyo. It was the first joshi puroresu event held in the venue in six years. The card featured four of Stardom's five titles on the line, various participants from other wrestling promotions, including male wrestlers, and was headlined by the retirement match of Yuzuki Aikawa. The event was attended by 5,500 fans, making it Stardom's largest crowd to date in their two-year history. A special movie edition of the event, featuring backstage material, was premiered at a theater in Ichikawa, Chiba and released on DVD on September 28.

2014–2018
In 2014, a new monthly television program began airing on Samurai TV during this time called Stardom Cafe. The program was hosted by Yuzuki Aikawa and took place in a cafe. Aikawa interviewed various wrestlers on the roster as well as showed highlights of recent matches and activities outside the ring. Stardom Cafe ran each month until December 2015.

Starting in 2015, Stardom began holding Korakuen Hall shows every month, making them the first Joshi Puroresu promotion since Gaea Japan to do so.

At Stardom's next Korakuen Hall show on February 22, 2015, Stardom Queen's Shout, the main event of Yoshiko defending her World of Stardom Championship against Act Yasukawa ended in controversy when the match had to be ended prematurely. Yoshiko and Yasukawa began shooting on each other, a boundary in professional wrestling that is rarely crossed. Yoshiko gained the advantage in the situation and severely injured Yasukawa's face, to the point where veteran referee Kyohei Wada had to stop the match. Following the match, Yasukawa was rushed to a Tokyo hospital, where she was diagnosed with fractured cheek, nasal and orbital bones and required surgery. Yasukawa had, just two months earlier, returned from a long injury break brought on by thyroid issues, during which she had also underwent cataract surgery. In addition to the outcome, leading up to the show, Yoshiko had refused to sign the contract for the match, as she felt Yasukawa was unfit to challenge for her title after their previous title match had been cancelled due to Yasukawa's Graves' disease flare. Yoshiko eventually signed the contract in the ring just before their match after Yasukawa and her new Oedo Tai teammates attacked her. Stardom's president Rossy Ogawa publicly apologized for the incident and called an emergency meeting for February 23 with general manager Fuka Kakimoto and top senpais for the roster to discuss the situation. On February 25, Stardom held a press conference where Yoshiko publicly apologized for her actions, was stripped of the World of Stardom Championship and was suspended indefinitely. Ogawa, Kakimoto and Takahashi also announced they were taking a 30% pay cut for the next three months. Stardom also banned face punches from the promotion. Violations resulted in a disqualification for the first offense. A ringside doctor is now assigned to all future events and Kairi Hojo was subsequently named intermediary between the wrestlers and management in order to bring the two sides closer. This would end up being Yoshiko's final appearance for Stardom.

April 23 saw the beginning of a new annual event, the Cinderella Tournament, a one-day single-elimination tournament, with the winner being presented a dress by Yuzuki Aikawa and is granted a wish of their choice. The methods of winning consist of pinfall, submission, over-the-top-rope elimination, ten-minute time limit (except for the final), with time limit draws resulting in a double elimination. Mayu Iwatani won the first tournament by defeating Koguma in the final.

Also in 2015, Stardom held shows in Los Angeles County, California. This was the first time that Stardom held shows outside of Japan. Stardom's first United States show took place on October 16 in Covina, California, main evented by Io Shirai successfully defending her Wonder of Stardom Championship against Mia Yim. The second show took place two days later in Baldwin Park, California, headlined by Thunder Rock retaining their Goddess of Stardom Championship against the team of Hiroyo Matsumoto & Kellie Skater.

In November, Stardom began an interpromotional feud with Sendai Girls' Pro Wrestling during the latter's Korakuen Hall show. The event saw Meiko Satomura, Dash Chisako, Sendai Sachiko, Cassandra Miyagi, Mika Iwata, and Chihiro Hashimoto against Io Shirai, Mayu Iwatani, Kairi Hojo, Momo Watanabe, Hiromi Mimura, and Kris Wolf, in a series of singles matches with gauntlet rules. Three days later, at Stardom's Korakuen Hall show, Mayu Iwatani was defeated by Meiko Satomura in her challenge for the World of Stardom Championship and Io Shirai successfully defended her Wonder of Stardom Championship against challenger Sendai Sachiko; the two had gone to a time limit draw three days earlier.

On February 28, 2016, Stardom launched Stardom World, a worldwide paid video service through YouTube. The service was later moved to its own website. In April, Io Shirai, Kairi Hojo and Mayu Iwatani represented Stardom in the United States, taking part in events for Lucha Underground and a match at the Cauliflower Alley Club.

In May, Threedom (Shirai, Iwatani, and Hojo) traveled to Europe, taking part in shows in Spain, France, and England. A new championship was introduced on the show in Spain, the Stardom World Association (SWA) World Championship. Io Shirai defeated Toni Storm in a tournament final to determine the first champion. The qualifications of defending the SWA title were that the opponent must be a different nationality to the champion.

On February 18, 2018, Stardom announced the creation of the promotion's seventh active title, the Future of Stardom Championship, the title is meant for wrestlers with less than two years of experience in professional wrestling or under the age of 20.

2019–present

Stardom also introduced a new collaboration with Fire Pro Wrestling World, a video game developed by Spike Chunsoft. This would be Stardom's first involvement with a video game and was released on August 22, 2019. Kagetsu, Hazuki, Andras Miyagi, Utami Hayashishita, Momo Watanabe, Mayu Iwatani, Arisa Hoshiki, Starlight Kid, Jungle Kyona, and Hana Kimura would be the Stardom wrestlers that were created for the release and all appeared in the ring during the announcement.

On October 17, a press conference was held in which the purchase of Stardom by entertainment company, Bushiroad, was announced. Bushiroad is also the owner of New Japan Pro-Wrestling, making Stardom their sister promotion. Stardom president Rossy Ogawa would remain as Stardom's head producer.

At New Japan Pro-Wrestling's Wrestle Kingdom 14 on January 4, 2020, Mayu Iwatani and Arisa Hoshiki faced Hana Kimura and Giulia in a tag team dark match, marking the first women's match to take place at a Wrestle Kingdom event.

On March 5, the second Fire Pro Wrestling World collaboration was released, with Giulia, Death Yama-san, Konami, Saya Iida, Tam Nakano, Saki Kashima, Bea Priestley, AZM, Natsuko Tora, Sumire Natsu, and Saya Kamitani added to the game.

Apart from the March 8 Korakuen Hall show, Stardom canceled all remaining March shows due to the COVID-19 pandemic in Japan. No People Gate was presented from an empty Korakuen Hall on March 8, and was aired live on their YouTube channel. The next Stardom show would be the Cinderella Tournament on March 24, and was held at Korakuen Hall with a limited number of tickets sold at the door. Fans and venue staff went through temperature checks and face masks were mandatory. Additional events were canceled throughout April and May, meaning Stardom's Ota Ward Gym show and the unit-produced shows held during Golden Week in early May would no longer be taking place. In the meantime, Stardom wrestlers began doing live streams on the Stardom YouTube channel and social media to interact with fans.

On 23 May 2020, Hana Kimura committed suicide in a case investigated as cyberbullying after an incident traced to her appearance on the Fuji TV reality show Terrace House. On 16 December 2020, Osaka police announced a case is pending in the legal system with a gentleman from the area the suspect.

On August 15, 2020, Stardom canceled a Saturday show in Osaka, putting a halt to the 5-star Grand Prix, after a performer tested positive for COVID-19.

On December 20, 2020, the experience level required for the Future of Stardom Title was changed from two years to less than three years of wrestling experience.

On November 20, 2022, Stardom held a co-promoted event with sister promotion New Japan Pro-Wrestling named Historic X-Over. On July 29, Stardom and NJPW announced the IWGP Women's Championship, a title for Stardom that would be defended at NJPW events both in Japan and the United States with the inaugural champion being crowned at Historic X-Over. At the event, Kairi defeated Iwatani to become the inaugural champion.

Roster

Accomplishments

Broadcasters
Domestic:
 Tokyo MX (2020, 2021–present broadcasts weekly highlights show We are STARDOM!! and live specials)
 Fighting TV Samurai (2010–present, currently broadcasting live specials, retrospective shows, and magazine shows)
 BS Nippon TV (2020–2021, currently broadcasting weekly episodes of We are STARDOM!! matches)
Worldwide:
 Stardom World (streaming service, broadcasting most Stardom shows live, as well as on-demand classic and documentary content)

Championships

Main roster

Developmental

Shared

Other promoted

Grand slam champions
In Stardom, the Grand Slam consists of all the available titles promoted by the company except the Future of Stardom Championship. They are the World of Stardom Championship, the Wonder of Stardom Championship, the Goddess of Stardom Championship, the Artist of Stardom Championship, the High Speed Championship and the SWA World Championship. The notion of "grand slam" has officially started being mentioned on May 5, 2022, when Mayu Iwatani became the second wrestler in the company to achieve the feature after Io Shirai.

List of notable pay-per-views

Annual tournaments

References

External links

 

 
2010 establishments in Japan
Japanese women's professional wrestling promotions
Kōtō
Sport in Tokyo
Bushiroad